Khalazir Rural District is in Aftab District of Tehran County, Tehran province, Iran. At the National Census of 2006, its population was 8,051 in 1,977 households. There were 13,285 inhabitants in 3,663 households at the following census of 2011. At the most recent census of 2016, the population of the rural district was 20,004 in 5,810 households. The largest of its 13 villages was Morteza Gerd, with 15,506 people.

References 

Tehran County

Rural Districts of Tehran Province

Populated places in Tehran Province

Populated places in Tehran County